Deferrisoma camini is a moderately thermophilic and anaerobic bacterium from the genus of Deferrisoma which has been isolated from a deep-sea hydrothermal vent from the Eastern Lau Spreading Centre in the Pacific Ocean.

References

Thermodesulfobacteriota
Bacteria described in 2012